Nutsubidze is a Georgian surname. Notable people with the surname include:

 Giorgi Nutsubidze (born 1998) is a rugby union player 
 Shalva Nutsubidze (1888 – 1969) was a Georgian philosopher, translator and public benefactor, one of founders of the Tbilisi State University

Georgian-language surnames